Julian John Valarino (born 23 June 2000) is a Gibraltarian footballer who plays as a midfielder for Gibraltarian club Lincoln Red Imps and the Gibraltar national team.

Club career
Valarino made his debut at Lincoln Red Imps in 2019, but remained in the youth team for the next two years until he joined Lynx on loan in January 2021. His performances earned him his first national team call-up, with one goal in nine appearances. In August 2021, he again went out on loan, this time to St Joseph's. He scored a brace on his debut, a 4–1 win over his former side Lynx, on 16 October 2021.

International career
Valarino made his international debut for Gibraltar on 24 March 2021 against Norway.

Career statistics

International

References

External links
 
 
 

2000 births
Living people
Gibraltarian footballers
Association football midfielders
Association football fullbacks
Lincoln Red Imps F.C. players
Lynx F.C. players
St Joseph's F.C. players
Gibraltar Premier Division players
Gibraltar youth international footballers
Gibraltar under-21 international footballers
Gibraltar international footballers